The 1994 Men's Asian Games Basketball Tournament was held in Hiroshima from 3 to 15 October 1994.

Results
All times are Japan Standard Time (UTC+09:00)

Preliminary round

Group A

Group B

Classification 5th–8th

Semifinals

7th place game

5th place game

Final round

Semifinals

Bronze medal game

Gold medal game

Final standing

References
Results

External links
Basketball Results

men